David Shanahan (born 20 June 1993) is an Irish professional rugby union player who plays scrum-half for Ulster.

He attended Belvedere College in Dublin, and played for Ireland at U18, U19 and U20 level, but did not win a place in the Leinster academy. Ulster's then forwards coach Allen Clarke, who had coached him at under-age international level, persuaded him to join Ulster's academy, and he was assigned to club side Ballymena while studying at Queen's University Belfast.

He made his debut for Ulster while still in the academy in 2013, and his first start in 2017, in place of the injured Ruan Pienaar. Under coach Dan McFarland, he has mainly acted as backup to John Cooney.

Ulster describe him as "a livewire scrum-half known for his speed, excellent support lines, and try-scoring ability". Out-half Ian Madigan calls him "Ulster's unsung hero".

References

External links
Ulster Rugby profile
United Rugby Championship profile

ItsRugby profile

1993 births
Living people
Irish rugby union players
Rugby union scrum-halves
Ulster Rugby players
People educated at Belvedere College
Rugby union players from Dublin (city)